The Wedding Ring is a 1944 Czech comedy film directed by Martin Frič.

Cast
 Otomar Korbelář as Jan Sochor
 Marie Blazková as Sochorova druhá zena
 Nadezda Vladyková as Sochorova první zena
 Hermína Vojtová as Sochorova první tchyne
 Vlasta Fabianová as Krezna
 František Smolík as Kníze Ferdinand Andres
 Zdeněk Dítě as Robert, mladý kníze
 Jana Dítětová as Baruska Sochorová
 Růžena Šlemrová as Baronka
 Jindřich Plachta as Doktor
 Jaroslav Marvan as Farár
 Vladimír Repa as Lesní
 Ferenc Futurista as Kocí Václav

References

External links
 

1944 films
1944 comedy films
1940s Czech-language films
Czechoslovak black-and-white films
Films directed by Martin Frič
Czechoslovak comedy films
1940s Czech films